Vasily Yuryevich Golubev (born 30 January 1957) is a Russian politician serving as Governor of Rostov Oblast since 14 June 2010.

Career and life 
He was a member of Communist Party of USSR. He became a politician in Moscow and Moscow Oblast where he was an acting governor for several weeks. He moved to Rostov after Vladimir Chub left his post of Oblast head and was connected to United Russia. His wife is a rich businesswoman.

References

External links

1957 births
Communist Party of the Soviet Union members
United Russia politicians
21st-century Russian politicians
Governors of Rostov Oblast
People from Tatsinsky District
Living people
Governors of Moscow Oblast
State University of Management alumni